Wanaparthy is a town of Wanaparthy district of Telangana, India. The first polytechnic college (KDR Government Polytechnic) in Telangana started in Wanaparthy. It is located 149 km from the state capital Hyderabad.

History
Wanaparthy was governed by a feudal ruler, Rameshwar Rao II is visiting  Raja of Wanaparthy in 2008, who was a vassal of the Nizam of Hyderabad. Wanaparthy was one of the 14 major Zamindari segments in Telangana in Post-Independent India. Raja died on 22 November 1922. As his successor, Krishna Dev was a minor, his estate was managed by the Court as his ward. Krishna Dev died before attaining adulthood and the crown passed on to his son Rameshwar Rao III. Soon after India abolished all regal titles. Suravaram Pratapareddy entered politics from (INC - Indian National Congress) at the end of his life and was elected to the Hyderabad State Legislative he won the first general election and he is the first Wanaparthy M.L.A in 1952.  
After the formation of the Telangana Government, Wanaparthy is proposed as a district along with the other 14 new district proposals to the new government apart from the 10 existing districts.

Demographics
The total population constituted  males,  females and  children (age group of 0–6 years). The average literacy rate was 77.91% with  literates, higher than the national average of 73.00%.

Notable personalities 

 Singireddy Niranjan Reddy – Cabinet Minister, Telangana.(Agriculture, Marketing, Civil supplies, co-operation, consumer)
 Ravula Chandra Sekar Reddy – Politician from Telugu Desam Party ex-MLA for Wanaparthy constituency
 Dr.Gillela Chinna Reddy – AICC secretary from Indian National Congress ex-Minister, MLA for Wanaparthy constituency
 Raghavendar Askani – Politician from Loksatta Party, Founder Youth Parliament Program
 Kiran Rao - Indian film producer

Wanaparthy Samsthanam 

Wanaparthy Samsthanam or Raja of Wanaparthy was a vassal of Nizam of Hyderabad. He controlled the feudatory of Wanaparthy.

References

Mandals in Wanaparthy district
Cities and towns in Wanaparthy district